Wilson Township is a township in Grundy County, in the U.S. state of Missouri.

Wilson Township was established in 1872.

References

Townships in Missouri
Townships in Grundy County, Missouri